Fayette County is  a county in the Commonwealth of Pennsylvania. It is located in southwestern Pennsylvania, adjacent to Maryland and West Virginia. As of the 2020 census, the population was 128,804. Its county seat is Uniontown. The county was created on September 26, 1783, from part of Westmoreland County and named after the Marquis de Lafayette.

Fayette County is part of the Pittsburgh, PA Metropolitan Statistical Area. The southern border of Fayette County is the southern border of Pennsylvania at both the Pennsylvania–Maryland state line (the Mason–Dixon line) and the Pennsylvania–West Virginia state line.

History
The first Europeans in Fayette County were explorers, who had used an ancient American Indian trail that bisected the county on their journey across the Appalachian Mountains. In 1754, when control of the area was still in dispute between France and Great Britain, 22-year-old George Washington fought against the French at the Battle of Jumonville Glen and Fort Necessity. British forces under Washington and General Edward Braddock improved roads throughout the region, making the future Fayette County an important supply route.

During the Revolutionary War, Fayette County was plagued by attacks from British-allied Indians and remained isolated as a frontier region. Also retarding settlement was a border dispute with Virginia; Virginia's District of West Augusta and Pennsylvania's Westmoreland County both claimed the area. In 1780 the dispute was settled by the federal government in favor of Pennsylvania, and Fayette County was formed from Westmoreland County in 1783.

Fayette County settlers provided the new United States government with an early test of authority in the 1793 Whiskey Rebellion, when farmers rebelled against tax collectors to protest a new liquor tax. President George Washington called out the militias to restore order. However, they were talked out of any violent action by owner of Friendship Hill and future Secretary of the Treasury, Albert Gallatin. Fayette County continued to be important to travelers in the early 1800s. The National Road provided a route through the mountains of the county for settlers heading west. The shipyards in Brownsville on the Monongahela River built ships for both the domestic and international trade.

As Pittsburgh developed its industries in the mid-19th century, Fayette County became a center of coal mining and coke production. From the 1880s to the early 1900s, the area's great expansion in steel production became nationally important, and labor unions shaped national policies. Both new European immigrants and African Americans in the Great Migration from the rural South were attracted to the Pittsburgh area for industrial jobs. The historic Scottish and German farming communities established in the earlier 19th century were soon overshadowed by the wave of immigrants from Southern and Eastern Europe. The region's wealth has been concentrated largely among the old English and Scottish families who had established businesses and political power in Pittsburgh prior to and in the advent of industrialization, often building the new manufacturing concerns, as did Andrew Carnegie.

By World War II, Fayette County had a new unionized working class that enjoyed increased prosperity. In the 1950s, however, the coal industry fell into decline. In the 1970s, the restructuring and collapse of American steel resulted in a massive loss of industrial jobs and hard times in the area. The population has declined since the peak in 1940, as residents have had to move elsewhere for work. The loss of union jobs caused many working families to drop out of the middle class. Only a few mines are being worked in the 21st century, but natural resources remain crucial to the local economy. The region is slowly transitioning toward the service sector, with an increase in jobs in fields such as telemarketing.

Geography
The western portion of the county contains rolling foothills and two valleys along the Monongahela and Youghiogheny rivers. The eastern portion of the county is highly mountainous and forested. Many coal mines are located within the area.

Adjacent counties
Westmoreland County (north)
Somerset County (east)
Garrett County, Maryland (southeast)
Preston County, West Virginia (south)
Monongalia County, West Virginia (southwest)
Greene County (west)
Washington County (northwest)

National protected areas
 Fort Necessity National Battlefield
 Friendship Hill National Historic Site

Climate
Fayette has a humid continental climate (Dfa/Dfb).

Demographics

As of the 2010 census, there were 136,606 people, 59,969 households, and 41,198 families residing in the county. The population density was 188 people per square mile (73/km2). There were 66,490 housing units at an average density of 84 per square mile (32/km2). The racial makeup of the county was 93.30% White, 4.71% Black or African American, 0.11% Native American, 0.22% Asian, 0.01% Pacific Islander, 0.11% from other races, and 2.33% from two or more races. 1.38% of the population were Hispanic or Latino of any race. 19.8% were of German, 13.2% Italian, 11.4% Irish, 9.2% American, 8.4% Polish, 7.9% English and 6.6% Slovak ancestry.

There were 59,969 households, out of which 28.70% had children under the age of 18 living with them, 51.80% were married couples living together, 12.40% had a female householder with no husband present, and 31.30% were non-families. 28.00% of all households were made up of individuals, and 14.50% had someone living alone who was 65 years of age or older. The average household size was 2.43 and the average family size was 2.96.

In the county, the population was spread out, with 22.70% under the age of 18, 7.70% from 18 to 24, 27.20% from 25 to 44, 24.20% from 45 to 64, and 18.10% who were 65 years of age or older. The median age was 40 years. For every 100 females, there were 91.80 males. For every 100 females age 18 and over, there were 87.60 males.

2020 Census

Government
The County of Fayette is governed by a three-member publicly elected commission. The three commissioners serve in both executive and legislative capacities. By state law, the commission must have a minority party member, guaranteeing a political split. Each member serves a four-year term. Current commissioners are Democrat Vince Vicites and Republicans David Lohr and Scott Dunn.

In October 2015, Sidney Bush, the first African American elected to county office, was sworn in as controller. She is a longtime county employee.

The Fayette County Court of Common Pleas serves as the primary judicial arm in the region. Judges are elected to ten-year terms in accordance with Commonwealth law. Additionally, district judges serve throughout the county and rule on minor offenses. Current judges are President Judge John F. Wagner Jr., Steve P. Leskinen, Nancy Vernon, Linda Cordaro, and Joseph M. George Jr.

Politics

|}

In August 2022, for the first time in county's history, the total number of registered Republican voters exceeded the number of registered Democrats.

As of November 7, 2022, there are 79,451 registered voters in Fayette County.

 Republican: 36,121 (45.46%)
 Democratic: 35,240 (44.35%)
 Independent: 5,730 (7.21%)
 Third Party: 2,360 (2.97%)

Historically, Fayette County tended to be strongly Democratic-leaning in statewide and national elections due to a strong union history, as county residents tend to be liberal on economic issues. At the presidential level, the Democratic candidate won by over 15 points in every election from 1932 through 2004 except 1972, usually winning by 25 points or more. However, similar to the rest of Western Pennsylvania outside of Pittsburgh and Erie, most residents tend to be socially conservative, and the county has been trending steadily towards the Republicans since 1996. In the past six presidential elections, the Republican party has continued to improve in each successive election, and the county was one of only 41 counties nationwide to flip from Democratic to Republican in 2008. Despite losing nationwide and statewide by a large margin, John McCain became the first Republican since 1972 and only the second Republican since 1928 to win Fayette County in 2008, and four years later, Mitt Romney became only the second Republican since 1928 to win a majority of the county's vote. In 2016, Republican Donald Trump won the county by a massive margin of 31 points, carrying the county 64–33 and becoming the first Republican to win the county by double digits since 1928, as well as the first Republican to receive over 60% of the county's vote in history. Four years later, he improved on his margin, winning 66.4-32.9. The county has also become solidly Republican in non-presidential races, with Republicans Lou Barletta and Scott Wagner carrying the county in the 2018 Senate and gubernatorial races, respectively, despite both losing statewide by landslide margins of over 10 points, although both won by narrow margins of less than 3 points in Fayette County.

State representatives
Serve 2 year terms in Pennsylvania House of Representatives

Bud Cook, Republican, 49th District
Pam Snyder, Democrat, 50th District
Matt Dowling, Republican, 51st District
Ryan Warner, Republican, 52nd District

State senator
Pat Stefano, Republican, 32nd district serves 4-year term in Pennsylvania Senate.

U.S. Representative
Guy Reschenthaler, Republican (14th district)

U.S. Senators
Serves six year terms in U.S. Senate
John Fetterman, Democratic
Bob Casey Jr., Democratic

Education

Colleges and universities
 Penn State Fayette, The Eberly Campus is a Commonwealth Campus of the Pennsylvania State University system located in Lemont Furnace. Penn State Fayette is the only four-year (bachelors) degree granting institution in Fayette County.

Public school districts

 Albert Gallatin Area School District
 Belle Vernon Area School District (also in Westmoreland County)
 Brownsville Area School District (also in Washington County)
 Connellsville Area School District ( biggest school in Fayette county)
 Frazier School District
 Laurel Highlands School District
 Southmoreland School District (also in Westmoreland County)
 Uniontown Area School District

Private schools

 Apostolic Christian Academy - Dunbar
 Bible Baptist Academy - Uniontown
 Champion Christian School - Champion
 Chestnut Ridge Christian Academy - Uniontown
 Connellsville Area Catholic School - Connellsville
 Geibel Catholic High School - Connellsville
 Mount Carmel Christian School - Mount Pleasant
 Mount Moriah Christian School - Smithfield
 Mount Zion Christian Academy - Acme
 New Meadow Run Parochial School - Farmington
 Spring Valley School	- Farmington
 St John Evangelist School - Uniontown
 Verna Montessori School - Prittstown

Intermediate unit
Fayette County is served by Intermediate Unit #1 which provides a wide variety of services to public, charter and private schools in the region. Early screening, special educations services, speech and hearing therapy and driver education are available. Services for children during the preschool years are provided without cost to their families when the child is determined to meet eligibility requirements. The IU1 also provides the state mandated multiple background screenings for potential school employees. A variety of professional development services are also available to the schools' employees.

Transportation
While Fayette County is a generally rural area and is not directly tied into the interstate system, it features four-lane access to the city of Pittsburgh and several of its major suburban areas. State highway plans call for the establishment of direct freeway connections with Pittsburgh to the north and Morgantown, West Virginia to the south.

Major highways

Public transportation
The primary provider of mass transportation within the region is Fayette Area Coordinated Transportation, which features local bus routes as well as four times-daily commuter service to Pittsburgh. Amtrak rail service along the Chicago-to-Washington-via-Cleveland Capitol Limited route stops at Connellsville Station. General aviation services are also provided at the Joseph A. Hardy Connellsville Airport.

Communities

Under Pennsylvania law, there are four types of incorporated municipalities: cities, boroughs, townships, and, in at most two cases, towns. The following cities, boroughs and townships are located in Fayette County:

Cities
Connellsville
Uniontown (county seat)

Boroughs

Belle Vernon
Brownsville
Dawson
Dunbar
Everson
Fairchance
Fayette City
Markleysburg
Masontown
Newell
Ohiopyle
Perryopolis
Point Marion
Seven Springs (partly in Somerset County)
Smithfield
South Connellsville
Vanderbilt

Townships

Brownsville
Bullskin
Connellsville
Dunbar
Franklin
Georges
German
Henry Clay
Jefferson
Lower Tyrone
Luzerne
Menallen
Nicholson
North Union
Perry
Redstone
Saltlick
South Union
Springfield
Springhill
Stewart
Upper Tyrone
Washington
Wharton

Census-designated places
Census-designated places are geographical areas designated by the U.S. Census Bureau for the purposes of compiling demographic data. They are not actual jurisdictions under Pennsylvania law. Other unincorporated communities, such as villages, may be listed here as well.

Allison
Arnold City
Bear Rocks
Buffington
Chalkhill
Deer Lake
East Uniontown
Edenborn
Fairhope
Farmington
Grindstone
Hiller
Hopwood
Leith-Hatfield
Lemont Furnace
Lynnwood-Pricedale
Naomi
New Salem
Oliver
Republic
Ronco
Rowes Run
Smock
South Uniontown
Star Junction

Unincorporated communities

 Acme
 Adah
 Collier
 Fairbank
 Gans
 Lake Lynn
 McClellandtown
 Melcroft
 New Haven
 Normalville, (originally named Elm)
 Oliphant Furnace
 Sagamore
 Whitsett
 Wickhaven

Population ranking
The population ranking of the following table is based on the 2010 census of Fayette County.

† county seat

Fixtures
 Fort Necessity is a reconstructed historic stockade that was originally built by George Washington to defend against an attack during the French and Indian War. Located in Wharton Township, it is now operated as a national battlefield.
  General Edward Braddock's Grave is across the highway from Fort Necessity. He was mortally wounded while attacking Fort Duquesne (at the "forks of the Ohio River" in present-day Downtown Pittsburgh) during the French and Indian War. It is a unit of the national battlefield. Under an agreement with British government, the site of Braddock's grave is officially considered British soil.
  The National Road (also known as the Cumberland Road) bisects Fayette County. It was the first significant roadway to be paid for by the federal government, connecting Baltimore, Maryland to Vandalia, Illinois. US 40 follows the path of this historic toll road.
   Two historic fixtures from the National Road exist within Fayette County's borders. Searights Toll House in Menallen Township is one of few remaining toll collection stops along the old route. The Washington Tavern, a unit of Fort Necessity National Battlefield, is a classic example of an early 19th-century inn.
   The town of Perryopolis was designed by George Washington during his career as a surveyor. It includes a restored grist mill that once served as an (unsuccessful) business venture for the future president.
 Fallingwater, architect Frank Lloyd Wright's most famous home, is located atop a flowing waterfall in Stewart Township. His lesser known Kentuck Knob is also located within the same municipality.
 Friendship Hill, the home of the little-known but highly influential early-19th-century political figure Albert Gallatin, is maintained as a National Historic Site. It is located in Springhill Township.
  Fayette County's southern border is adorned with plaques that mark its significance as part of the Mason–Dixon line
  A collection of waterfalls surrounding the Youghiogheny River Gorge are protected as part of Ohiopyle State Park.
 Laurel Ridge State Park contains an extensive hiking trail that traverses much of Pennsylvania's Appalachian foothills.
  The county contains the largest cave in Pennsylvania, Laurel Caverns, which is popular as both a tour and spelunking destination.
  A historic trading post that eventually was turned into a spectacular mansion is featured in Nemacolin Castle. The structure is well known for its connections to the Underground Railroad.
 The prestigious Nemacolin Woodlands Resort is located in Wharton Township. It features a five star hotel and has received a license for a slots casino.
  Mountainous Eastern Fayette County is home to the Seven Springs Mountain Resort, which is the premier skiing destination for Greater Pittsburgh.

Notable people
 Bob Bailor, former MLB utility player (raised in Connellsville)
 John A. Brashear, Astronomer and optical telescope fabricator (born in Brownsville)
 Jim Braxton, All American at West Virginia University and former NFL running back (raised in Vanderbilt)
 John Dickson Carr, mystery writer and three time Edgar Allan Poe Award winner (raised in Uniontown)
 Rhoda Chase, well-known 1940s radio and stage personality, nicknamed "The Blue Velvet Voice" (raised in Uniontown)
 Todd Tamanend Clark, poet and composer (resides in German Township since 1993)   
 Robert L. Coble, materials scientist who discovered the Coble creep and invented the sodium-vapor lamp (raised in Uniontown)
 Sarah B. Cochran, active philanthropist, director on multiple corporate boards and built Linden Hall (raised in Tyrone Township)
 Vinnie Colaiuta, session and band drummer for a wide range of jazz, fusion, rock, and funk performers (raised in Republic)
Major Coxson, drug kingpin in Philadelphia in the early 1970s (born in Fairbank)
 Doug Dascenzo, former Major League Baseball outfielder (raised in Brownsville)
 Ernie Davis, 1961 Heisman Trophy Winner and first overall selection in the 1962 NFL Draft (raised in New Salem until age 12)
 Thomas Dolinay, former chief bishop of the Byzantine Catholic Metropolitan Church (raised in Uniontown)
 Chuck Drazenovich, All-pro Middle Linebacker for the Washington Redskins and U.S. Heavyweight Boxing Champion for Penn State (raised in West Brownsville)
 Tory Epps, former NFL defensive lineman (raised in Uniontown)
 Fabian Forte, 1960s pop musician (resides in Dunbar Township)
 Albert Gallatin, Secretary of the Treasury, U.S. House Majority leader, and founder of New York University (spent much of adult life in New Geneva, which he founded and named)
 Gus Gerard, former NBA forward (raised in Uniontown)
 Joe Hardy, founder of 84 Lumber, one of the country's largest privately owned companies (resides in Wharton Township)
 Alfred Hunt, founder of Bethlehem Steel (born and raised in Brownsville)
 Philander C. Knox, Secretary of State, U.S. Senator, and U.S. Attorney General (raised in Brownsville)
 John Kundla, educator, college/professional basketball coach (born in Star Junction)
 Stu Lantz, former NBA guard and current Los Angeles Lakers color commentator (raised in Uniontown)
 Johnny Lujack, 1947 Heisman Trophy Winner and former NFL quarterback (raised in Connellsville)
 George C. Marshall, 1953 Nobel Peace Prize Winner, Secretary of State, World War II Supreme Allied Commander, and author of the Marshall Plan (raised in Uniontown)
 Jerry McKenna, sculptor (born in Connellsville)
 Terry Mulholland, former MLB starting pitcher (raised in South Union Township)
 Chuck Muncie, former NFL running back (raised in Uniontown)
 Marie Hochmuth Nichols, rhetorical critic (born in Dunbar)
 Ronald D. Palmer, career diplomat and US Ambassador to Togo, Malaysia, and Mauritius (raised in Uniontown) 
 Tamora Pierce, fantasy writer known for creating The Song of the Lioness series (raised in Dunbar until age 8)
 Edwin S. Porter, film pioneer and director of The Great Train Robbery (raised in Connellsville)
 Ed Roebuck, former MLB relief pitcher (raised in East Millsboro)
 Henry Miller Shreve, pioneering captain who opened the Mississippi River to steamboat navigation (lived life in Brownsville)
 C. Vivian Stringer, Rutgers women's basketball coach who is the third winningest women's coach in NCAA history (raised in Edenborn)
 Jacob B. Sweitzer, Civil War general and significant figure in the Battle of Gettysburg (born in Brownsville)
 Saul Swimmer, documentary film maker best known for The Concert For Bangladesh; co-producer of The Beatles' Let It Be (raised in Uniontown)
 John Woodruff, track gold medalist at the 1936 Summer Olympics (raised in Connellsville)
 Frank Wydo, former NFL offensive tackle (raised in Footedale)
 Dorian Johnson, All American for University of Pittsburgh (born in Belle Vernon)
 Charles Graner was a prison officer here before moving to another county.

In popular culture
In 1967 Uniontown was the birthplace of the McDonald's Big Mac sandwich.

See also
 National Register of Historic Places listings in Fayette County, Pennsylvania
 John Hopwood

References

External links

Coalfields of the Appalachian Mountains - Connellsville Coal Field

 
1783 establishments in Pennsylvania
Populated places established in 1783
Counties of Appalachia
Pittsburgh metropolitan area
Populated places on the Underground Railroad
Laurel Highlands